Talsi Municipality is a municipality in Courland, Latvia. The municipality was formed in 2009 by merging Abava parish, Balgale parish, Ģibuļi parish, Īve parish, Ķūļciems parish, Laidze parish, Lauciene parish, Lībagi parish, Lube parish, Strazde parish, Valdgale parish, Vandzene parish, Virbi parish, Talsi town, Stende town, Sabile town and Valdemārpils town with its countryside territory. In 2021 the municipality was expanded to include the former Dundaga municipality, Mērsrags municipality and Roja municipality. The administrative centre of the municipality is Talsi city. The population in 2022 was 35,194.

On 25 January 2023, a traffic sign was erected with the municipality's Livonian name to reflect its Livonian cultural heritage as part of the Livonian language revival process. The sign is notable for being the first Livonian-language traffic sign in Latvia; more of this kind are planned to be established in the region.

Population

Twin towns — sister cities

Talsi is twinned with:

 Alanya, Turkey
 Lejre, Denmark
 Orhei, Moldova
 Prienai, Lithuania
 Saaremaa, Estonia
 Shchyolkovo, Russia
 Söderköping, Sweden
 Telavi, Georgia

Symbols 
After the 2021 administrative reform, the previous coat of arms and flag of the municipality were abolished and work began on creating new ones.

See also
 Administrative divisions of Latvia (2009)

References

 
Livonians
Municipalities of Latvia